Hale, Cheshire could refer to two places:

Hale, Greater Manchester (historically in Cheshire)
Hale, Halton (historically in Lancashire)